A black hole cosmology (also called Schwarzschild cosmology or black hole cosmological model) is a cosmological model in which the observable universe is the interior of a black hole. Such models were originally proposed by theoretical physicist Raj Pathria, and concurrently by mathematician I. J. Good.

Any such model requires that the Hubble radius of the observable universe be equal to its Schwarzschild radius, that is, the product of its mass and the Schwarzschild proportionality constant. This is indeed known to be nearly the case; at least one cosmologist, however, considers this close match to be a coincidence.

In the version as originally proposed by Pathria and Good, and studied more recently by, among others, Nikodem Popławski,
 the observable universe is the interior of a black hole existing as one of possibly many inside a larger parent universe, or multiverse.

According to  general relativity, the gravitational collapse of a sufficiently compact mass forms a singular Schwarzschild black hole. In the Einstein–Cartan–Sciama–Kibble theory of gravity, however, it forms a regular Einstein–Rosen bridge, or wormhole. Schwarzschild wormholes and Schwarzschild black holes are different mathematical solutions of general relativity and the Einstein–Cartan theory. Yet for observers, the exteriors of both solutions with the same mass are indistinguishable. The Einstein–Cartan theory extends general relativity by removing a constraint of the symmetry of the affine connection and regarding its antisymmetric part, the torsion tensor, as a dynamical variable. Torsion naturally accounts for the quantum-mechanical, intrinsic angular momentum (spin) of matter. The minimal coupling between torsion and Dirac spinors generates a repulsive spin-spin interaction which is significant in fermionic matter at extremely high densities. Such an interaction prevents the formation of a gravitational singularity. Instead, the collapsing matter reaches an enormous but finite density and rebounds, forming the other side of an Einstein-Rosen bridge, which grows as a new universe. Accordingly, the Big Bang was a nonsingular Big Bounce at which the universe had a finite, minimum scale factor. Or, the Big Bang was a supermassive white hole that was the result of a supermassive black hole at the heart of a galaxy in our parent universe.

See also
 List of most massive black holes

References

Black holes
Physical cosmology